Philygria debilis is a species of shore flies (insects in the family Ephydridae).
P. debilis Loew, 1861

References

Ephydridae
Articles created by Qbugbot
Taxa named by Hermann Loew
Insects described in 1861